Wick Football Club is a football club based in Wick, near Littlehampton, England. Wick joined the Sussex County League Division Two in 1964. In the 1998–99 season, they reached the 4th round of the FA Vase. Prior to the 2013–14 season, they merged with near neighbours Barnham.

History

Wick became founding members of the West Sussex Football League in 1896, joining the Junior Division.

Wick joined Division Two of the Sussex County League in 1964–65 and then spent the next eighteen seasons in Division Two, eventually winning promotion in 1983 after finishing as champions.  They then spent three seasons in Division One before being relegated, but bounced back the following season (1985–86) after winning Division Two for a second time.

From then until the end of the 2002–03 season, Wick were ever-present in Division One of the County League, winning the League Challenge Cup in 1987–88.

In 1989–90 they lifted the Division One title, as well as the RUR Charity Cup.  In 1992–93 they won the Sussex Senior Cup for the only time, beating Oakwood at the Goldstone Ground, 3–1. The 1993–94 season they won the championship for the second time, finishing 14 points clear of runners-up Whitehawk.

The league cup was won in the 1996–97 season and finished runners-up to Burgess Hill Town. The following season under manager Jimmy Quinn, Wick finished third in the League, but reached the semi-finals of the Senior Cup, and won the RUR charity Cup, which they retained in the following 1998–99 season.

In 2000–01, the club finish third, but two seasons later in the 2002–03 campaign the club was relegated to Division Two.

The club finished as runners-up to Crowborough Athletic in 2004–05 to move back into the top division of the Sussex league.

Carl Stabler joined as manager in 2006–07 with the remit of rising Wick Football Club out of the County League and after 3 seasons stepped up to Chairman and handed over the reins of the football side of the club to manager Vic Short.

Prior to the 2013–14 season, they merged with near neighbours Barnham and to become members of the Southern Combination Football League Premier Division.

However, the clubs split again at the end of the 2015–16 season, with Wick taking the place of the first team in the Southern Combination Football League Premier Division. The following season saw them relegated to Division One for the 2017–18 season.

Ground

Wick play their games at Coombsfield   (Capacity 1,240), Coombs Way, Wick, Littlehampton, West Sussex BN17 7LS.

Honours

League honours
Sussex County League Division One
 Winners (2): 1989–90, 1993–94
 Runners Up (1): 1996–97
Sussex County League Division Two
 Winners (2): 1981–82, 1985–86
 Runners Up (1): 2004–05

Cup honours
Sussex Senior Challenge Cup
 Winners (1): 1992–93
The John O'Hara League Challenge Cup
 Winners (1): 1987–88, 1996–97
 Runners Up (2): 1994–95, 1995–96
The Sussex Royal Ulster Rifles Charity Cup
 Winners (3): 1989–90, 1997–98, 1998–99
 Runners Up (2): 1975–76, 2009–10
Sussex County Football Association Floodlight Cup
 Runners Up (2): 1994–95, 1996–97
Sussex County League Division Two Cup
 Runners Up (1): 1981–82

Club records
Highest League Position: 1st in Sussex County League Division One: 1989–90, 1993–94
FA Cup best performance: Second Qualifying Round: 1981–82
FA Vase best performance: Fourth Round: 1998–99
Highest Attendance: 153 vs Littlehampton Town: 2006–07

Former coaches
 Managers/Coaches that have played/managed in the football league or any foreign equivalent to this level (i.e. fully professional league).
 Managers/Coaches with full international caps.

  Carmelo D'Anzi

References

External links
Official club website

 
Southern Combination Football League
Football clubs in West Sussex
Arun District
Association football clubs established in 1892
Football clubs in England
1892 establishments in England
West Sussex Football League